This is a list of current and former Roman Catholic churches in the Diocese of Santa Rosa in Northern California. The diocese is divided geographically into five deaneries as follows: Humboldt/Del Norte (Del Norte and Humboldt Counties); Mendocino/Lake (Lake and Mendocino Counties); Napa (Napa County); Sonoma North (northern Sonoma County); and Sonoma South (southern Sonoma County).

Humboldt/Del Norte Deanery

Mendocino/Lake Deanery

Napa Deanery

Sonoma North Deanery

Sonoma South Deanery

References

 
Santa Rosa